Valkov is a Slavic masculine surname, its feminine counterpart is Valkova or Válková. Notable people with the surname include:

Aleksandr Valkov (born 1986), Russian football player
Diyan Valkov (born 1993),  Bulgarian football player
Helena Válková (born 1951), Czech politician
Jitka Válková, Czech beauty pageant contestant 
Katerina Valková (born 1996), Czech volleyball player
Konstantin Valkov (born 1971), Russian cosmonaut
Stanimir Dimov-Valkov (born 1978), Bulgarian football player
Vasily Valkov (1904–1972), Soviet ambassador
Zuzana Valkova (born 1989), Czech group rhythmic gymnast